John Franklin (born John Paul Salapatek; June 16, 1959) is an American actor, writer and former school teacher. He is best known for playing Isaac Chroner in Children of the Corn (1984), and Cousin Itt in The Addams Family (1991).

Early life
He was born John Paul Salapatek in Blue Island, Illinois, a southern suburb of Chicago, on June 16, 1959. As a child, Franklin had a growth hormone deficiency; as a result, his adult height is "barely 5 feet", or roughly 152 centimeters.

In 1977, John graduated from Dwight D. Eisenhower High School. He graduated from the University of Illinois in 1983 with a BFA in theater and teaching.

Career
In 1983, John Franklin moved to Los Angeles, California to pursue a career in acting. He appeared in commercials before successfully auditioning for the role of Isaac in Stephen King's Children of the Corn.

After Children of the Corn, Franklin went on to guest star in two episodes of the kids' variety show Kids Incorporated, "The Leprechaun" and "Space Case." He appeared in many commercials before guest starring on Highway to Heaven as Arnie, a mentally handicapped teenage runaway. He also played "Walkabout-Chucky" during the 'Good Guy' doll commercial in the 1988 movie Child's Play.

In 1991, Franklin landed the role of Cousin Itt in The Addams Family; he reprised the role in 1993's Addams Family Values. Throughout the 1990s, Franklin appeared as a guest on several TV shows, including Chicago Hope and Star Trek: Voyager. He co-starred with David Morse in the independent 1997 film George B. and with Steve Guttenberg in Disney’s TV movie Tower of Terror the same year.

In 1999, Franklin reprised his debut role, Isaac, in Children of the Corn 666: Isaac's Return, co-writing the script with his cousin Tim Sulka. In 2000, he landed a small role in Python and co-starred as Morluv in The Christmas Secret.

Franklin formerly worked as an English teacher at Golden Valley High School in Santa Clarita, California. He explained, 
After the events of 9/11, I saw the shallowness of showbiz and felt a great desire to leave a greater legacy than just being Cousin Itt. Teaching seemed to be a perfect fit for my theatrical talents and to touch many lives."

At the end of the 2015–16 school year, Franklin announced to the students and staff of Golden Valley High School that he would be retiring from teaching to reprise his career as an actor and writer. He later was reported to be working on several projects, including a young adult novel.

Filmography

References

External links

1959 births
Living people
Male actors from Chicago
American male film actors
American people of Polish descent
American gay actors
LGBT people from Illinois
People from Blue Island, Illinois
University of Illinois alumni
Teachers of English
Schoolteachers from California